Kihnu Airfield  is an airfield on Kihnu island in Estonia. It has no IATA airport code and is owned by AS Pärnu Lennujaam (Pärnu Airport Ltd).

Overview
The airfield has two crossing runways; 04/22  and 15/33 , both with grass surface. There are no landing lights or navigational systems on the airfield. Therefore, the airfield is only certified for VFR in daylight. There are no regular flights to Kihnu since Air Livonia stopped operating. Small private planes use the airfield for general flights in the summer. Also LFH does charter flights to Kihnu.

The operators of the airfield warn that the airfield is not fenced in, so pilots who wish to land outside of the airfield's operational hours need to make sure that there are no people, animals or other obstacles on the runways before landing.

Airlines and destinations
There are no scheduled operations at the airfield.

References

External links
Kihnu Airfield

Airports in Estonia
Kihnu Parish
Buildings and structures in Pärnu County